Antônio Brasileiro is the fifteenth album by Antônio Carlos Jobim. It was released days after his death in 1994. The album was completed 11 months before his death, and was a critical and commercial success.

Track listing
 "Só Danço Samba"
 "Piano Na Mangueira"
 "How Insensitive" ("Insensatez") (featuring Sting)
 "Querida"
 "Surfboard"
 "Samba de Maria Luiza"
 "Forever Green"
 "Maracangalha"
 "Maricotinha"
 "Pato Preto"
 "Meu Amigo Radamés"
 "Blue Train" ("Trem Azul")
 "Radamés Y Pelé"
 "Chora Coração"
 "Trem de Ferro"

Guest vocalists:
 Sting on "How Insensitive"
 Maria Luiza Jobim on "Samba de Maria Luiza" and "Forever Green"
 Dorival Caymmi on "Maricotinha"

References

Antônio Carlos Jobim albums
1994 albums
Albums published posthumously
Grammy Award for Best Latin Jazz Album
Columbia Records albums